Feixi County is a county of Anhui Province, East China, it is under the administration of the prefecture-level city of Hefei, the capital of Anhui.

Township-level divisions
Towns
 Shangpai, Sanhe, Taohua, Huagang, Gaoliu, Guanxiang, Xiaomiao, Shannan, Fengle, Zipeng

Townships
 Gaodian Township, Mingchuan Township, Shishugang Township, Yandian Township

Other Areas
Taohua Industrial Park Management Committee, Zipengshan Management Committee

Climate

References

 
Hefei